School of Hotel Administration may refer to:
Cornell University School of Hotel Administration
William F. Harrah College of Hotel Administration, at University of Nevada, Las Vegas
School of Hotel Administration (Ithaca), a private school
Graduate School of Hotel Administration (Pai), a unit of the Dr. T. M. A. Pai Foundation in India